Jelena Dokić was the defending champion, but lost in the second round to compatriot Olivia Rogowska.

Hsieh Su-wei took the title by defeating No.5 seed Petra Martić in the final 2–6, 7–5, 4–1. Martić retired due to fatigue and cramping after playing a three-hour semifinal match earlier in the day.

Seeds

Draw

Finals

Top half

Bottom half

Qualifying

Seeds
The top seed received a bye into the second round (of the qualifying).

Qualifiers

Draw

First qualifier

Second qualifier

Third qualifier

Fourth qualifier

References
 Main Draw
 Qualifying Draw

Malaysian Open - Singles